Anthony  Lever Pedroza Durazo (born March 7, 1979 in Tucson, Arizona) is a  Mexican-American professional basketball player. He is a 6'3" Guard who played international basketball from the France, Croatia, Bosnia, NBA, and professional league in Mexico with  Soles de Mexicali in the Liga Nacional de Baloncesto Profesional in Mexico.  He is also a member of the Mexico national basketball team. Anthony is the son of basketball player Fat Lever.

Anthony has played professionally in Venezuela and Mexico.  Currently, consulting for US and Mexican companies. Now he is handling community activities with NBA Mexico and many other entrepreneur endeavors throughout the United States and Mexico.

Pedroza is a long-time member of the Mexico national basketball team.  He competed for the team at the FIBA Americas Championship in 2003, 2005, 2007, and 2009.  In 2009, he scored a team-leading 17 points against the Virgin Islands in Mexico's  preliminary round victory.

References

External links
 RealGM profile

1979 births
Living people
American expatriate basketball people in Bosnia and Herzegovina
American expatriate basketball people in Croatia
American expatriate basketball people in France
American expatriate basketball people in Venezuela
American men's basketball players
American sportspeople of Mexican descent
Basketball players from Tucson, Arizona
Guards (basketball)
Junior college men's basketball players in the United States
Louisiana Ragin' Cajuns men's basketball players
Mexican men's basketball players
Mexican people of African-American descent
Oregon Ducks men's basketball players
Ostioneros de Guaymas (basketball) players
Soles de Mexicali players